The Sovereign Military Order of the Temple of Jerusalem (OSMTH, OSMTJ) are a group of self-styled chivalric orders of common descent. In 2020, OSMTH and SMOTJ were recognized by the Augustan Society as a religious confraternity of knights.

OSMTH and OSMTJ are often referred to simply as the Knights Templars. They make a moral and ethical claim to follow in the same spiritual path as the original Order of the Knights Templar. OSMTH and OSMTJ, which are open to Christians of any denomination, operate as a charity and an order of chivalry.

History
The l'Ordre du Temple was made public in France in 1705 by Philippe II, Duke of Orléans, and claimed to be the continuation of the medieval Knights Templar, using the Larmenius Charter as evidence of its pedigree. The order was officially reconstituted in 1804 by Bernard-Raymond Fabré-Palaprat. The modern groups claim that it was recognized as an order of chivalry by Napoleon Bonaparte in 1805, who organized a public parade and ceremony for the Order. The Ordre du Temple was then under the administration of the KVMRIS lodge beginning in 1894 until it was registered as OSMTJ in 1932.

In 1970, a schism occurred within the Order when General Antoine Zdrojewski was unexpectedly elected as the new Grand Master at the Convent of Paris in September, 1970. Zdrojewski's following retained the French translation: "Ordre Souverain et Militaire du Temple de Jérusalem", until his death in 1989. Zdrojewski was succeeded by Georges Lamirand as the new head of the OSMTJ until his death in 1994. George Lamirand was succeeded by Nicolas Haimovici Hastier as OSMTJ International, who was succeeded by BG Ronald S. Mangum.

The faction which remained with de Sousa Fontes after the 1970 election used the Latin acronym OSMTH. In 1997, OSMTH voted to expel Grand Master Fernando de Sousa Fontes from the order. This resulted in another schism with those loyal to Fontes forming a new organization presently known as OSMTH-Regency while the remainder of the organization continued on as OSMTH.

While OSMTH/OSMTJ rituals and traditions are based upon those of the historical Knights Templar, there is no hard claim of direct historical lineage claimed by the current orders and the 12th century Templars. However, the OSMTJ embraces the possibility of direct descent from the medieval Templars.

In 2001, OSMTH was accredited by the United Nations Economic and Social Council as a non-governmental organisation, in special consultative status, one of over 2,000 organizations to hold this status. The Order is an associate member of the International Peace Bureau and an affiliate of the International Center for Religion & Diplomacy, which was founded by one of OSMTH's members. In 2014, OSMTH was elected as a board member of CoNGO (Conference of NGOs in consultative status with the United Nations.

Organisation

The order exists in each country under different jurisdictions.  The United States Grand Priory of the OSMTH is known as the Sovereign Military Order of the Temple of Jerusalem, Inc. (SMOTJ) - this being the English rendering of the Latin name. They should not be confused with a multitude of other self-styled "Knights Templar", or the Masonic Knights Templar.

OSMTH is registered in Geneva, Swiss Reg No: CH-660.1.972777-4 and is in Special Consultative Status with the Economic and Social Council of the United Nations has over 5000 active members in Austria, Brazil, Bulgaria, Canada, Croatia, England & Wales, Finland, France, Germany, Greece, Ireland, Italy, Mexico, Norway, Portugal, Scotland, Serbia, Slovenia, Ukraine and in the United States. OSMTH operates in a number of countries providing humanitarian aid  such as the River Jordan Project that is supported by HM King Abdullah of Jordan.

The ecumenical Christian organization operates as a modern-day network of educated professionals. As of August 2007, the organization had approximately 5,200 members.

Christian men who join the organization are dubbed as "Knights" with the title of Chevalier and females are termed "Dames" with the title of Chevaleresse (or Chevalière). The modern Order claims over 5000 members, including leaders in the military, business, government and ecclesiastical communities.

The Order's Royal Patron, who is also a Chevalière of the Order, is Princess Elisabeth of Isenburg-Büdingen (b. 1945).

The Religious Protector of OSMTH is Patriarch Nourhan Manougian, the Armenian Patriarch of Jerusalem.

Schisms

Ordre Souverain et Militaire du Temple de Jérusalem (OSMTJ) 
Since its 1932 registration in Brussels the Order has been known as OSMTJ. In 1970, an election was held in Paris for the office of Grandmaster, and the Regent Fernando de Sousa Fontes refused to obey the laws of succession when General Antoine Zdrojewski was elected.  Some of the Grand Priories, including the French, Belgian, Swiss, and Polish, followed the newly elected General Zdrojewski, and some stayed loyal to Fontes.

Alfred Zappelli (Grand Prior of Switzerland), General Georges de Bruyn (Grand Prior of Belgium), and Badouraly-Somji Alibay (Commander of the Polish Commandery) were also backers of General Zdrojewski. After the election, de Sousa Fontes changed the official language of his branch to Latin, and began using the acronym OSMTH. Zdrojewski and those who followed him retained the traditional usage of OSMTJ. “OSMTJ” is the French acronym  for  “Ordre Souverain et Militaire du Temple de Jérusalem.”

In late 1973, Grand Master Zdrojewski carried out a re-organization of the OSMTJ and a reform of the Statutes. He approved the Grand Priories re-asserting the independence of the International Federation of Autonomous Grand Priories of the OSMTJ (Each member Grand Priory was recognized as autonomous). The Swiss Grand Priory accepted these reformed statutes in 1973, while the Belgian Grand Priory and United States Grand Priory accepted them in 1975.

Zdrojewski was succeeded by Georges Lamirand as the new head of the OSMTJ until his death in 1994. George Lamirand was succeeded by Dr. Nicolas Haimovici Hastier as Regent. In January 2020, the OSMTJ elected retired Brigadier General Ronald S. Mangum as Grandmaster.

Sovereign Military Order of the Temple of Jerusalem (SMOTJ) 
The Sovereign Military Order of the Temple of Jerusalem (SMOTJ), founded in 1962, is the American autonomous Grand Priory of the Ordo Supremus Militaris Templi Hierosolymitani (OSMTH). branch of the Ordo Supremus Militaris Templi Hierosolymitani.  The SMOTJ broke with the OSMTH-Regency in 1995 when it refused to recognize the sovereignty of OSMTH-Regency Grand Master Dom Fernando de Sousa Fontes.

This name Sovereign Military Order of the Temple of Jerusalem (SMOTJ) has been trademarked and is used exclusively in America by the SMOTJ and thus does not refer to the group of organizations tracing lineage to OSMTH but rather to the current OSMTH only.

References

Further reading
 Daniel Clausen, "Templar Succession: Establishing Continuity 1307-Present", ISBN 979-8465277525
BBC Website 'What are the Knights Templar up to now?'. News Magazine 2007-10-19
 BBC Radio 4. On the Trail of the Templars  Program audio, first broadcast 2007-06-18
 Stephen Howarth. The Knights Templar, 1991. 
 Chev. Leo Thys, KCTJ. "History of the Order of the Temple of Jerusalem: From 1118 to 2005", 
 Templar Order, the templar's path à path toward the wisdom, Domizio Cipriani, Bastogi libri, 2016, translated in tree languages,

External links

 Ordre Souverain et Militaire du Temple de Jérusalem (OSMTJ)
Knights Templar (OSMTJ) Grand Priory of the United States
Ordo Supremus Militaris Templi Hierosolymitani (OSMTH)
 Ordo Supremus Militaris Templi Hierosolymitani (OSMTH) - Regency
 Grand Priory of the Knights Templar in England and Wales (OSMTH)
 Ordo Supremus Militaris Templi Hierosolymitani Universalis (OSMTHU)
 Ordre Souverain et Militaire du Temple de Jérusalem - Magisterial Council (OSMTJ)
 Sovereign Military Order of the Temple of Jerusalem (SMOTJ) - Grand Priory of the USA (Member of OSMTH)
 Summary information about the SMOTJ
 OSMTH Brasil

Self-styled orders
Organisations based in Switzerland
Christian ecumenical organizations